The Arapaho are a tribe of Native Americans who originally lived in what is now eastern Colorado and Wyoming.

Arapaho or Arapahoe may also refer to:
Arapahoe Tribe of the Wind River Reservation, federally recognized tribe of Northern Arapaho in Wyoming
Cheyenne and Arapaho Tribes, federally recognized tribe of Southern Arapaho in Oklahoma
Arapaho language

Places
Arapahoe, Colorado, an unincorporated town
Arapahoe County, Colorado
Arapahoe Basin, a ski area in Colorado
Arapaho Center station (Dallas Area Rapid Transit), a transit station in Richardson, Texas
Arapahoe at Village Center (RTD), a transit station in Greenwood Village, Colorado
Arapahoe, Nebraska, a small city
Arapahoe, Wyoming, a town on the Wind River Indian Reservation, home to the Northern Arapahoe Tribe
Arapahoe, North Carolina, a small town on the eastern coast of North Carolina on the Neuse River
Arapaho, Oklahoma, county seat of Custer County, Oklahoma

Transportation
, a sloop-of-war or frigate which was never constructed, being canceled in 1866
, a tugboat launched on 20 June 1914
, a tugboat laid down on 8 November 1941 at Charleston, South Carolina
Piper PA-40 Arapaho, a replacement for the Piper PA-39 Twin-Comanche C/R. Only three built, project cancelled
Bell ARH-70 Arapaho, a light military helicopter designed for the United States Army's Armed Reconnaissance Helicopter (ARH) program.

Other
The "Arapaho" project, referring to the PCI Express computer expansion card interface format

See also
Arapaha, a Timucua town in Spanish Florida